Tyas may refer to:
 Edward Tyas Cook (1857–1919), English journalist, biographer, and man of letters
 John Tyas (1833–1903), English-Australian linguist, bibliophile and University of Adelaide registrar
 Sean Tyas (born 1979), American DJ and electronic music producer

See also 
 Tya (disambiguation)